"1000 Mankai No Kiss " (1000万回のキス, 1000 Mankai no Kisu, meaning "10 Million Times Kiss")  is a song recorded by Japanese singer songwriter Mai Kuraki, taken from her tenth studio album Over the Rainbow (2012). The song was written by Kuraki, Aika Ohno and Takeshi Hayama and served as the commercial song to the KOSÉ's brand, Esprique Precious. Ohno covered the song on her third studio album Silent Passage (2013).

Track listing

Charts

Weekly charts

Monthly charts

Year-end charts

Certification and sales

|-
! scope="row"| Japan (RIAJ)
| 
| 25,013
|-
|}

Release history

References

External links 

Songs about kissing
2011 singles
Mai Kuraki songs
Song recordings produced by Daiko Nagato
Songs written by Mai Kuraki
Songs written by Aika Ohno
2011 songs